Anamorós is a municipality in the La Unión department of El Salvador.

The associated Catholic parish was the first post of future archbishop and martyr Óscar Romero.

History

In 1770, people of the parish was Anamoros leaks, with 170 inhabitants in 72 families, as census data collected by the Archbishop Pedro Cortes y Larraz. In 1786, he joined the party Gotera. In 1807, he was already head of the parish of the same name, with the peoples of Polorós and Lislique as annexes. According to the geographer, Mr. William Dawson won the title of town in 1871. By Legislative Decree No. 173 of October 31, 1972, was conferred the title of city to the village of Anamoros.

Sports
The local football club is named C.D. La Asunción and it currently plays in the Salvadoran Second Division.

External links

Municipalities of the La Unión Department